Love, Creekwood is a young adult novella by American author Becky Albertalli, released on June 30, 2020. The book follows Leah on the Offbeat (2018), and serves as an epilogue to it and Simon vs. the Homo Sapiens Agenda (2015).

Background
After the release of Leah on the Offbeat (2018), author Albertalli stated that there would be no further sequels to the "Simonverse". However, following the announcement of the novella on Twitter, she wrote that the readers' "enthusiasm is the reason I had the opportunity to write this." Albertalli has also confirmed that all profits from the sale of the book will be donated to The Trevor Project, an American LGBTQ nonprofit organization.

References

2020 American novels
2020s LGBT novels
American young adult novels
American LGBT novels
American bildungsromans
Female bisexuality in fiction
Gay male teen fiction
LGBT-related young adult novels
Novels set in high schools and secondary schools
Novels with bisexual themes
American novellas
Balzer + Bray books